The Likatier tribe (in German Stamm der Likatier, known as Stamm Füssen Eins until 1998) is a pseudo-religious community of about 200 people (more than half being minors) who live and work together in Füssen in the south of Germany. Wolfgang Wankmiller founded the group in 1974. since there had been indecent assaults of children within the "Likatier", the group withdaw from public. Wankmiller is said to be father of 15 children from different women.

The group is not a tribe in the usual sense, since anyone can become a member. It owns several houses and businesses in the city, and critics sometimes view it as a cult or sect, although members do not share a common well-defined religious or spiritual belief system.

History 
The community was founded in 1974 by then 17-year-old Wolfgang Wankmiller, who led it untll his death in 2019. It strives for independence and self-sufficiency with minimal environmental impact, practices ovo-lacto vegetarianism, and encourages free love while tolerating stable relationships. Separate men's and women's discussion groups meet weekly. Children are raised as a group by several women; some children are schooled privately by members of the tribe in a house across the border in Austria (as home schooling is not possible in Germany).

In the first few years, according to their own statements up to 1990, the members were mainly involved in local politics in various parties; environmental and civil right movement as well as more closeness to the citizen are stated as goals. The group tried to achieve its goals through multiple memberships of one and the same person in different parties. This ultimately also led to party exclusions.

Several of the group's activities are related to esotericism, and a self-description states "our foremost goal is the perception and understanding of reality and its expression in vibrancy". The group also has its own internal currency and employs a creative approach to language, giving uncommon names to days or to everyday objects. It intends to create a genuine new "tribe culture" and is in active contact with other ecological communities around the world.

The group is hierarchically organized, with members having different "levels" reflecting their commitment to the tribe. There is also an outer circle of people who join the group in some of its activities but for the most part live separately.

In the 1970s the tribe tried to undermine several organizations in Füssen, and Wankmiller was active in local politics for a while. The Likatier are generally regarded with suspicion or even hostility in the city, and a citizen's action group has been formed that opposes the tribe and supports people who want to leave it.

In 2001, a cook of the group was sentenced to  years in prison for sexual abuse of five minor members of the tribe. While the trial judge found that the behavior was neither condoned by nor connected to the group, critics have pointed out that the cook was readmitted to the community after having served his sentence. The German yellow press occasionally reports on the group in a sensationalist manner, labeling Wankmiller as a "Sex-Guru", claiming that he believe himself to be a reincarnation of Jesus, and accusing the group of running sex orgies in the presence of minors.

To counter negative publicity, the group started a website in 2003. It has always welcomed outside visitors, and has recently started to offer "get-to-know" seminars.

Structur

Hierarchy 
The adults belong to the so called "oath group" of the clan. The "oath people" have sworn to stay in the group forever. These people give all their possessions to the group: apartments, cars, inheritances belongs.

In addition, there are a number of so-called "living people". These are people who live there but have not committed themselves to anything. For the group, the members had to work hard and get less money for this. At first there were only food, accommodation and clothing, later also cash.

The "executive-circle" around Wankmiller until he died is financaially very well off.

Business 
The clan runs several companies in different branches. In the HQ Füssen alone, the group owns at least 11 properties.

Wolfgang Wankmiller 
The founder of the group, Wolfgang Wankmiller, was born March 15, 1957, in Füssen and worked as custodian. From 1984 till 1990 he was member of the local council of Füssen. Wankmiller was vice-president of the conservative Bayernpartei. He called himself the reincarnation of Jesus Christ and Albert Einstein. Members of his cult, addressed him as "Jesus". He died on January 6, 2019, in Weißhaus because of pneumonia.

References

Sources

 "Sex-Guru" Wankmiller und seine Anhänger breiten sich in der Stadt aus - Nun steht einer von ihnen vor Gericht, Süddeutsche Zeitung, 15 January 2001 (German)
 Report on the group, tz (Munich yellow press), 8 January 2001 (German)
 Füssen und der geächtete Clan des Phantoms, Allgäuer Zeitung, 31 August 2006 (German)
 Report from a visitor (German)

External links
 Official home page of the Likatier tribe
 Newcomer.in, the youth organization of the tribe

Esotericism
Intentional communities in Germany
Organisations based in Bavaria
Organizations established in 1974